is a Japanese original video animation anime series produced by Aniplex and animated by Daume. It spanned 3 episode OVA series and ran in 2004. It was licensed for North American distribution by Geneon Entertainment and released as Le Portrait de Petite Cossette. The OVAs were broadcast in the United States on Fuse on December 15, 2007, and in Canada on G4techTV's Anime Current programming block from January 19, 2008 to February 2, 2008. It is currently licensed by Sentai Filmworks and available for streaming and video-on-demand via The Anime Network.

The series was adapted into a manga series by Asuka Katsura. It spanned two volumes and was published in 2004. The English-language release is published by Tokyopop.

Plot
The series focuses on Eiri Kurahashi, a college art student who works in an antique shop. One day, he sees the image of a girl in an antique glass. To his shock, she appears to be moving and living out her life before his eyes. He becomes infatuated with the girl, and one night at midnight, he somehow makes contact with her. He learns that her name is Cossette, and that she was an aristocrat's daughter during the 18th century. She reveals to him that her spirit has been entrapped within the glass because the artist Marcello Orlando murdered her. She tells Eiri that, in order to set her free, a man must be willing to take upon himself punishment for the sins Marcello committed.

As the series progresses, Eiri is tortured mentally and physically by Cossette, who demands that he prove his professed love for her. It is revealed that Eiri is the reincarnation of Marcello, and that Cossette is becoming as infatuated with him as he is with her. Also depicted are the efforts of the women in Eiri's life—relatives, friends, mentors, and the girl who secretly loves him—to free him from what is becoming apparent to them as a self-destructive path.

Characters

Cossette is a beautiful young girl whose spirit haunts a delicate Venetian glass. With delicate eyes, long blond hair and a lithe frame, her beauty is both haunting and enchanting. She was murdered by her lover Marcello Orlando because he became obsessed with her beauty and wanted her to stay young forever. Her soul was trapped in a glass. She convinced Eiri to enter "a pact of blood" to take revenge on Marcello. Since Eiri is the reincarnation of Marcello, she achieves this by torturing him. She later fell in love with Eiri.
There is a second Cossette created by Marcello. He drew such a perfect portrait of her, it gained life of its own. This Cossette was similar to the original, but a different being. She was jealous of the affection Eiri gave to the original Cossette and believed she was the true Cossette. She loved Marcello and considered Eiri a vessel for Marcello's soul.

Eiri is a talented budding artist, and works in his family's antique shop. His young world is transformed after he stumbles upon a delicate Venetian glass that is but a portal into the tragic world of a young girl named Cossette.  He falls in love with this illusion that is as beautiful as she is cursed. Eiri is in fact the reincarnation of Marcello, who was brought back by Cossette because she was desperate to purify herself and the other glasses that became cursed after Marcello murdered her and her family. He agrees to the blood pact because he does not want to lose Cossette and allows her to torture him for the same reason, vowing that no matter how much pain he suffers he will not kill Cossette like Marcello did.

Shoko is a close friend and confidant of Eiri.  Although an extremely sharp young lady, her insecurity is coupled with a neurotic nature that is endearing. She easily gets jealous when she hears about Eiri's love life. She cares deeply about him when he changes due to the pact he entered with Cossette, and is horrified when he starts to be wounded, asking what kind of person who claimed she loved him could do that. 
In appearance, she has brown hair that is parted in front, with one or two wisps that fall near her left eye. In back it falls several inches below her shoulders.

A young girl with undeveloped psychic abilities who works at the local deli. Although she doesn't know exactly what is going on with Eiri, her abilities allow her some insight into the paranormal roots of Eiri's obsession.
In appearance she has black hair cut straight across in front, and gathered behind into one 'tail' falling several inches down her back.  She often wears an apron.

Michiru works as the local tarot card reader and shares with Eiri an emotional bond that weaves her into the saga of Cossette's vengeance.

As the local priestess and psychic, Shakado's talents reveal frightening energies hovering over Eiri like the shadow of death. She attempts an exorcism to free him, but isn't powerful enough to break the blood pact. 
In appearance she has dark gray or black hair that is cut short, above her collar, with several sprays rather than cut straight.

The local physician and Shoko's aunt, Hatsumi is utterly confounded by Eiri's psychosomatic afflictions. When Shoko's soul is sent to Purgatory, she is unable to find a scientific explanation for her condition.
In appearance she has brown hair similar in length and cut behind as Shoko Mataki, wearing it behind her ears.  In front she has several wisps on her forehead. She wears glasses, and often her doctor's coat.

 A talented artist that was close with Cossette's family and was Cossette's fiancee. He murdered her and her family out of obsession with the Cossette he painted, not wishing Cossette to grow up. This action lead to the grudges of her family seeping into the glass objects of the house, turning them into cursed spirits.  Their despair, and her own at his betrayal, weighed down Cossette, trapping her in her glass. The final portrait he drew of Cossette was so life like that it gained a soul of its own similar, though different, from Cossette's true soul trapped in the glass. He was reincarnated as Eiri.

 He is a student who attends the same university as Eiri. An adult, he is frequently seen smoking.
He wears an orange beanie and has shortly cropped black and a thin beard.

He is an old man who made a great deal of money through tax and land fraud and buys the glass set Cossette's glass was a part of, although not Cossette's glass, which Eiri has removed.

She is the much younger lover of Yutaka Enokido. She frequently smokes and jokingly calls Yutaka her papa.

Media

OVA
Aniplex released the three Region 2 DVD compilations from May 26, 2004 to December 22, 2004. On December 1, 2004, the soundtrack to the OVA was released by Wint. It contained eighteen tracks by Yuki Kajiura, including the main theme music . Later released as a single on August 11, 2004, "Hōseki" is sung by Marina Inoue. During the period when Geneon Entertainment held the license, the episodes were aired on Fuse TV The anime has since been relicensed by Sentai Filmworks, with distribution from Section23 Films. The OVA was released on April 20, 2010 and streamed on the Anime Network a month later.

Petit Cossette is also licensed in New Zealand and Australia by Madman Entertainment, and in German by Tokyopop.

Manga
Le Portrait de Petit Cossette appeared as a serial in Monthly Magazine Z. Kodansha collected the chapters into two tankōbon volume and published them from August 11, 2004, to December 21, 2004.

Tokyopop licensed Le Portrait de Petit Cossette for an English-language release in North America and published the volumes from July 2006 to November 2006. However, both volumes are now out of print. The series is also licensed in France by Asuka Comics.

Reception

Anime News Network's Theron Martin described it as "an artsy, stylish supernatural horror story about love and obsession. Its dramatic visuals, exceptional artistry, and sumptuous musical scoring make watching it quite an experience, and the story isn't half bad, either." However, he noted that the storyline of the first two episodes was "fairly predictable" and the secondary characters were "underdeveloped and underused".
Reviewers at Mania Entertainment praised it as "a love story that's almost devoid of happiness, with a style and presentation that makes it engrossing, and yet not exactly easy to watch" and "an easy recommendation for those looking for something more mature from their anime."

References

External links
 Official site 
 Le Portrait de Petit Cossette at Madman Entertainment
 Le Portrait de Petit Cossette at MVM Entertainment
 

2004 anime OVAs
2004 manga
Anime OVAs composed by Yuki Kajiura
Aniplex
Dark fantasy anime and manga
Geneon USA
Psychological horror anime and manga
Romance anime and manga
Seinen manga
Sentai Filmworks